Fantastic Falls is a waterfall on the North fork of the Snoqualmie River in the U.S. state of Washington. At , is the largest of several small (none taller than ) waterfalls in the Ernie's Grove area.

See also
 Snoqualmie River

References

External links
 Cataloged Waterfalls in the Snoqualmie River Watershed

Waterfalls of King County, Washington
Waterfalls of Washington (state)
Horsetail waterfalls